The Peter, Paul and Mary Album, also known as Album, is the sixth studio album by the American folk music trio Peter, Paul and Mary, released in 1966 (see 1966 in music).

The album included sessions contributions from several in-demand musicians of the era, including Mike Bloomfield, Al Kooper and Charlie McCoy.  Notable songs include "Hurry Sundown", which was released as a single, and "Norman Normal," which provided the basis of a 1968 Warner Bros. Cartoon Special of the same name, co-credited to Noel Stookey.

Track listing

Side one
 "And When I Die" (Laura Nyro) – 2:45
 "Sometime Lovin'" (Gary Shearston) – 3:05
 "Pack up Your Sorrows" (Richard Fariña, Pauline Marden) – 3:04
 "The King of Names" (Peter Yarrow) – 4:05
 "For Baby (For Bobbie)" (John Denver) – 2:45
 "Hurry Sundown" (Yip Harburg, Earl Robinson) – 2:55

Side two
 "The Other Side of This Life" (Fred Neil) – 3:01
 "The Good Times We Had" (Paul Stookey) – 2:35
 "Kisses Sweeter Than Wine" (Paul Campbell, Joel Newman, Pete Seeger, Lee Hays) – 3:05
 "Norman Normal" (Stookey) – 2:15
 "Mon Vrai Destin" (Stookey, Mary Travers, Yarrow) – 2:19
 "Well, Well, Well" (Bob Gibson, Bob Camp) – 3:15

Personnel
Peter Yarrow – vocals, guitar
Noel "Paul" Stookey – vocals, guitar
Mary Travers – vocals
with:
Michael Bloomfield – guitar on "The King of Names"
Paul Butterfield – harmonica on "The King of Names"
Kenny Buttrey – drums on "Sometime Lovin'"
Pete Childs – Dobro on "Pack Up Your Sorrows"
Bobby Gregg – drums on "The Other Side of Life"
Ernie Hayes – piano on "The Other Side of Life"
Dick Kniss – bass on "Mon Vrai Destin"
Al Kooper – organ on "Well, Well, Well"
Bill Lee – bass on all tracks except 5, 10, 11 
Charlie McCoy – harmonica on "Sometime Lovin'"
Wayne Moss – guitar on "Sometime Lovin'"
Mark Naftalin – organ on "The King of Names"
Walter Raim – guitar on "Kisses Sweeter Than Wine"
Hargus "Pig" Robbins – piano on "Sometime Lovin'"
Buddy Saltzman – drums on "The King of Names"
Russ Savakus – bass on "For Baby (For Bobbie)"
Melvin Tax – bass flute on "The Good Times We Had"
Irving Horowitz – English horn on "The Good Times We Had"
Charles H. DeAngelis – bass clarinet, alto flute on "The Good Times We Had"
Technical
Brooks Arthur - engineer
Barry Feinstein - photography

Chart positions

References

Peter, Paul and Mary albums
1966 albums
Warner Records albums
Albums produced by Albert Grossman